The 2010 Parramatta Eels season is the 64th in the club's history. Coached by Daniel Anderson and captained by Nathan Cayless and Nathan Hindmarsh, they competed in the NRL's 2010 Telstra Premiership. The Parramatta club finished the regular season in 12th place failing to make the finals for the first time in two years.

Summary 
The Parramatta Eels were picked at the beginning of the year by many leading betting agencies to take out the premiership for 2010 following their surge of form which took them to the Grand Final in 2009. But, after a relatively poor to the season, and then a four-game winning streak, the Parramatta Eels once again returned to the inconsistent form of past seasons. This inconsistent form, recognised by all Rugby League fans, saw them miss out on the Top 8 in 2010.

After a season of unrelenting disappointment which saw five-eighth Daniel Mortimer dropped to reserve grade, centre Timana Tahu being suspended for an on-field confrontation against the Newcastle Knights and reports of player rifts, Daniel Anderson was sacked unceremoniously as Parramatta coach and replaced by New Zealand World Cup-winning coach Stephen Kearney.

Standings

National Rugby League

National Youth Competition

Fixtures

Pre-season

Home and away season

Players and staff
The playing squad and coaching staff of the Parramatta Eels for the 2010 NRL season as of 31 August 2010.

Transfers
In:

Out:

Awards
The following awards were awarded in the post-season:
Michael Cronin clubman of the year award: Dr Steve McNamara
Ken Thornett Medal (Players' player): Jarryd Hayne
Jack Gibson Award (Coach's award): Tim Mannah
Eric Grothe Rookie of the Year Award: Justin Horo

References 

Parramatta Eels seasons
Parramatta Eels season